Phaeomolis vampa is a moth of the family Erebidae first described by William Schaus in 1910. It is found in Nicaragua and Costa Rica.

References

Phaegopterina
Arctiinae of South America
Moths described in 1910